Maurice Champreux (1893–1976) was a French film director, cinematographer and editor.

Biography
Maurice Champreux married with Isabelle Feuillade. She is the daughter of famous French film director Louis Feuillade.

Maurice and Isabelle Champreux had a son, Jacques Champreux who became an actor, screenwriter and film director.

Selected filmography

Director
After Love (1924)
 The Five Cents of Lavarede (1927)
 Let's Touch Wood (1933)
 Judex (1934)

Cinematographer
 Barrabas (1920)

References

Bibliography
 Goble, Alan. The Complete Index to Literary Sources in Film. Walter de Gruyter, 1999.

External links

1893 births
1976 deaths
French film directors
French film editors
French cinematographers